Hotz is a surname. Notable people with the surname include:

Daniel Hotz, Swiss orienteer
Eric Hotz, Canadian graphic artist and illustrator
George Hotz (born 1989), American  security hacker
Günter Hotz (born 1931), German computer scientist
Jeremy Hotz (born 1963), Canadian actor and comedian
Jimmy Hotz (born 1953), American record producer and musician
Karl Hotz (1877–1941), German engineer and soldier
Kenny Hotz (born 1967), Canadian producer, writer, director, actor, and comedian
Kyle Hotz, American comic book writer and artist